Eishockey Club Lustenau, commonly referred to as EHC Lustenau or simply Lustenau, is an ice hockey team in Lustenau, Austria. They play in the Alps Hockey League.

History
The club was founded as EHC Lustenau in 1970. In 2000, the club was renamed Gunz EHC Lustenau. They took on their present name, EHC Oberschieder Lustenau in 2005.

Achievements
 Austrian National League champion: 1974, 1978, 1982, 1984, 1992, 1997, 2006, 2009.

External links
Official website 

Ice hockey clubs established in 1970
Ice hockey teams in Austria
Alpenliga teams
Inter-National League teams
Austrian National League teams
1970 establishments in Austria